Bend City is a former settlement in Inyo County, California. It was located on the Owens River near the modern-day town of Kearsarge. Founded in the 1863, Bend City was originally a mining camp. Bend City was the site of the first county bridge spanning the Owens River. The 1872 Lone Pine earthquake changed the course of the river away from the townsite, which had already declined. The site is now registered as California Historical Landmark #209.

California Historical Landmark
Bend City is a California Historical Landmark number 209, assigned on June 20, 1935.

The California Historical Landmark reads:
NO. 209 SITE OF BEND CITY - Bend City, a population center in the middle 1860s, was designated as the seat of Coso County, but the county was never formed. It was here that the first county bridge across Owens River was constructed. The 1872 earthquake changed the course of Owens River, so the site of Bend City was near an empty ravine instead of on a river bank.

See also
California Historical Landmarks in Inyo County
History of California through 1899

References

External links
 Bend City from www.ghosttowns.com Photos from the site.

Former settlements in Inyo County, California
Populated places established in 1863
Ghost towns in Inyo County, California
California Historical Landmarks